Eli Thomas Stackhouse (March 27, 1824 – June 14, 1892) was a U.S. Representative from South Carolina and an officer in the Confederate Army of Northern Virginia during the American Civil War.

Biography
Stackhouse was born in Little Rock, South Carolina, and attended the common schools. He worked on his father's farm. He taught school for several years and then engaged in agricultural pursuits. He enlisted in the Confederate States Army January 9, 1861, and served throughout the Civil War, attaining the rank of colonel of the 8th South Carolina Volunteers.

He served as member of the State House of Representatives from 1865 to 1866. He served as member of the first board of trustees of Clemson Agricultural and Mechanical College of South Carolina in 1887. He was the first president of the South Carolina State Farmers' Alliance in 1888.

Stackhouse was elected as a Democrat to the Fifty-second Congress and served from March 4, 1891, until his death in Washington, D.C., June 14, 1892.

He was interred in Little Rock Cemetery, Little Rock, South Carolina.

See also
List of United States Congress members who died in office (1790–1899)

References
 Retrieved on 2008-10-10

1824 births
1892 deaths
Clemson University trustees
People of South Carolina in the American Civil War
Confederate States Army officers
Democratic Party members of the South Carolina House of Representatives
Democratic Party members of the United States House of Representatives from South Carolina
19th-century American politicians
People from Little Rock, South Carolina